Løten Station is a railway station in the Løten municipality in Hedmark, Norway on the line between Hamar and Elverum. The station is located in the southern area of the main community. It is served by trains on operating the Rørosbanen line. The station is 143.78 km from Oslo Sentralstasjon.

The station was opened in 1862 as Berg Station with the completion of the line from Hamar to Grundset. The name was changed to Løiten in 1879 and to Løten in 1919. The station building, which probably contains parts from the original 1862 structure was moved and rebuilt in 1921. The station has been unstaffed since 1997. In addition to being a railway station, the building houses a tourist information desk, a hobby store and a ceramics workshop.

External links

Jernbaneverket's entry on Løten station
Map of the station area (Gulesider.no)

Railway stations on the Røros Line
Railway stations in Hedmark
Railway stations opened in 1862
1862 establishments in Norway
Løten